The large moth subfamily Lymantriinae contains the following genera beginning with G:

References 

Lymantriinae
Lymantriid genera G